Eva Christian (born Evelyne Gutmann, 27 May 1937) is a German actress who has appeared in numerous films since her 1958 film debut.

Selected filmography

References

External links
 
 Profile on schauspielervideos.de

1937 births
Living people
Actresses from Berlin
German film actresses
German television actresses
20th-century German actresses
21st-century German actresses